Russell Boast is a South African and American casting director for film and television.

Life and career
Russell was born in Durban, South Africa. He graduated from the University of South Africa and Durban University of Technology (DUT) in 1994. He started his career as a casting assistant on the film, Beyond Borders. Russell moved to Los Angeles in 2004. He is the former president of Casting Society of America. He is also a professor and the head of casting at Chapman University.

Filmography

 Oliver Outloud (2023)
 Student Body (2022)
 Nash Bridges (2021)
 The Little Drummer Boy (2021)
 Kill the Butterfly (2021)
 I'm Not Him (2021)
 Pooling to Paradise (2021)
 Forever Alone (2020)
 The Penitent Thief (2020)
 Juliet (2020)
 No Ordinary Man (2020)
 Gossamer Folds (2020)
 Household Demons (2020)
 Algorithm: BLISS (2020)
 Palomino & Swissy (2019)
 The Hypnotist's Love Story (2019)
 Extra Innings (2019)
 Dark/Web (2019)
 The Fix (2019)
 Proven Innocent (2019)
 Miller & Son (2019)
 Killing Karen Soloway (2018)
 Insatiable (2018)

 The Desecrated (2018)
 The Plural of Blood (2017)
 Chance (2017)
 Crowning Jules (2017)
 Your Own Road (2017)
 Mars Project (2016)
 Paradise Club (2016)
 The Tribe (2016)
 Wicked City (2015)
 Damsel (2015)
 Home Run Showdown (2015)
 Just Brett and Lilly (2015)
 The Time We're In (2015)
 Oishi High School Battle (2012)
 To the Moon (2012)
 From the Head (2011)
 Serving Up Richard (2011)
 White Irish Drinkers (2010)
 A Little Help (2010)
 The Whole Truth (2009)
 Spoken Word (2009)
 Hansie (2008)
 The Trail (2006)

Awards and nominations

References

External links
 

American casting directors
Living people
1972 births